William Tecumseh Sherman Garnjost (December 23, 1892 – October 4, 1958) was a professional football player, who played in the National Football League in 1921 for the Evansville Crimson Giants.

External links
Pro-Football-Reference

1892 births
Players of American football from New York (state)
Evansville Crimson Giants players
1958 deaths